Rudolf ("Rudi") Christopher Karl Dollmayer (born 17 January 1966) is a former butterfly and backstroke swimmer from Sweden. He competed for his native country at the 1992 Summer Olympics in the men's 100 m butterfly and the men's 100 m backstroke. He was affiliated with SK Ran in Malmö.

References

1966 births
Living people
Swedish male butterfly swimmers
Swimmers at the 1992 Summer Olympics
Olympic swimmers of Sweden
Swedish male backstroke swimmers
People from Karlskoga Municipality
Sportspeople from Örebro County
20th-century Swedish people